Fyodor Alekseyevich Astakhov (9 October 1966) was a Soviet Marshal of Aviation.

From the start of the German-Soviet War, he commanded the Air Force of the Soviet Southwestern Front. Then, from May 1942, he was chief of the Main Civil Aviation Directorate and deputy commander of the Air Force of the Red Army. Marshal Astakhov commanded civil aviation and achieved its effective use in the Battles of Stalingrad and Kursk and in other operations. From August 1943 to December 1944, he was commander of Long Range Aviation. From December 1944 to December 1947, he was again chief of the Main Civil Aviation Directorate.

Awards
 Two Order of Lenin
 Three Order of the Red Banner
 Order of Kutuzov 1st class
 Order of Suvorov 1st class
 Order of the Red Star
 campaign and jubilee medals

References

External links
 
 Fyodor Astakhov

1892 births
1966 deaths
People from Moscow Oblast
People from Kashirsky Uyezd
Communist Party of the Soviet Union members
First convocation members of the Verkhovna Rada of the Ukrainian Soviet Socialist Republic
Soviet Air Force marshals
Imperial Russian Army officers
Russian military personnel of World War I
Soviet military personnel of the Russian Civil War
Soviet military personnel of World War II
Recipients of the Order of Lenin
Recipients of the Order of the Red Banner
Recipients of the Order of Suvorov, 2nd class
Recipients of the Order of Kutuzov, 1st class